Om Noi officially the City of Om Noi is a municipality in Samut Sakhon, Thailand. It is located 13 km west from Bangkok.

References

External links

 

Populated places in Samut Sakhon province
Cities and towns in Thailand